Damn Fool is the second studio album by Big Scoob, released on May 3, 2011. The first single and video released was "All I Kno Is Hood" while "Akka Damn Fool" was also released as a digital single. Big Scoob plans to shoot a video with Glasses Malone for the song "They Don't Want It". Guests on the album include Glasses Malone, Bumpy Knuckles, Krizz Kaliko, Tech N9ne and Jay Rock.

Track listing

References

Big Scoob albums
2011 albums
Albums produced by Seven (record producer)
Strange Music albums